AM-2201 (1-(5-fluoropentyl)-3-(1-naphthoyl)indole) is a recreational designer drug that acts as a potent but nonselective full agonist for the cannabinoid receptor. It is part of the AM series of cannabinoids discovered by Alexandros Makriyannis at Northeastern University.

Hazards
Convulsions have been reported including at doses as low as 10 mg.

Pharmacology
AM-2201 is a full agonist for cannabinoid receptors. Affinities are: with a Ki of 1.0 nM at CB1 and 2.6 nM at CB2. The 4-methyl functional analog MAM-2201 probably has similar affinities. AM-2201 has an EC50 of 38 nM for human CB1 receptors, and 58 nM for human CB2 receptors. AM-2201 produces bradycardia and hypothermia in rats at doses of 0.3–3 mg/kg, comparable to the potency of JWH-018 in rats, suggesting potent cannabinoid-like activity.

Pharmacokinetics

AM-2201 metabolism differs only slightly from that of JWH-018. AM-2201 N-dealkylation produces fluoropentane instead of pentane (or plain alkanes in general).

Detection
A forensic standard of AM-2201 is available, and the compound has been posted on the Forendex website of potential drugs of abuse.

Legal status
In the United States, AM-2201 is a Schedule I controlled substance.

See also 
 AM-694
 AM-1235
 AM-2232
 AM-2233
 JWH-018
 SDB-005
 THJ-018
 THJ-2201
 MEPIRAPIM
 NM-2201

References 

Naphthoylindoles
Organofluorides
AM cannabinoids
Designer drugs
CB1 receptor agonists
CB2 receptor agonists